The 2018 Open de Cagnes-sur-Mer was a professional tennis tournament played on outdoor clay courts. It was the twenty-first edition of the tournament and was part of the 2018 ITF Women's Circuit. It took place in Cagnes-sur-Mer, France, on 7–13 May 2018.

Singles main draw entrants

Seeds 

 1 Rankings as of 30 April 2018.

Other entrants 
The following players received a wildcard into the singles main draw:
  Eugenie Bouchard
  Fiona Ferro
  Amandine Hesse
  Andrea Petkovic

The following players received entry from the qualifying draw:
  Alexandra Dulgheru
  Bibiane Schoofs
  Daniela Seguel
  Dayana Yastremska

The following players received entry as lucky losers:
  Jaimee Fourlis
  Priscilla Hon

Champions

Singles

 Rebecca Peterson def.  Dayana Yastremska, 6–4, 7–5

Doubles
 
 Kaitlyn Christian /  Sabrina Santamaria def.  Vera Lapko /  Galina Voskoboeva, 2–6, 7–5, [10–7]

External links 
 Official website
 2018 Open de Cagnes-sur-Mer at ITFtennis.com

2018 ITF Women's Circuit
2018 in French tennis
Open de Cagnes-sur-Mer
May 2018 sports events in France